Richard Bordeaux Parker (July 3, 1923 – January 7, 2011) was an American diplomat, who was as a Foreign Service Officer, and an expert on the Middle East. Parker served as Ambassador to Algeria, Lebanon and Morocco.

He was the brother of U.S. Army officer David Stuart Parker.

Early life
Parker was the son of Col. Roscoe Parker, a U.S. Army officer (Cavalry), and grew up in U.S. Army posts across the southwest with a stint in Vermont and another in Kansas.  He attended Kansas State University, but left in 1943 to join the U.S. Army during World War II.  Parker served as an infantry officer with the 106th Infantry Division (first platoon of the Anti-Tank Company of the 422nd Infantry Regiment), where he was captured by the Germans at the Battle of the Bulge and briefly imprisoned. Captured at the same time as Parker, was Donald Prell, who commanded the second platoon of the Anti-Tank Company. After the war, Parker returned to Kansas State, where he completed his B.S. degree in 1947 and then earned an M.S. degree in 1948, before joining the U.S. Foreign Service in 1949.

Diplomatic career

Parker served as deputy chief of mission in Rabat, Morocco from 1970 to 1974. He was ambassador to Algeria from 1975 to 1977, to Lebanon in 1977, and finally to Morocco from 1978 to 1979.  He retired from the U.S. Foreign Service in 1981 and became the editor of The Middle East Journal. In addition to his diplomatic career, Parker taught at the University of Virginia, Johns Hopkins University, and Lawrence University.  He also served as the first president of the Association for Diplomatic Studies and Training from 1986 to 1989.

In 1982, Parker participated in a study group held at the Council on Foreign Relations where he discussed current problems in North Africa.  After these meetings Parker spent two years compiling and writing North Africa: Regional Tensions and Strategic Concerns. His book was published in relation with and through the Council on Foreign Relations.

In June 2004, Parker received the American Foreign Service Association's lifetime Contributions to American Diplomacy award. He died at a nursing home in Washington, D.C. in January 2011. The ashes of Parker and his wife Jeanne were interred at Arlington National Cemetery in February 2011.

Service chronology

Papers
Ambassador Parker's papers are held at Georgetown University, in Washington, D.C.

Some of Richard Bordeaux Parker's photographs  are held at the Freer Gallery and Arthur M. Sackler Gallery Archives in Washington, D.C. The collection includes black and white negatives of Islamic architecture throughout Algeria, Cairo, Lebanon, Syria, Jordan, Morocco, and Spain.

Published books
 A Practical Guide to Islamic Monuments in Cairo, 1974
 A Practical Guide to Islamic Monuments in Morocco, 1981
 North Africa: Regional Tensions and Strategic Concerns, (1987) (revised and updated version)
 The Politics of Miscalculation in the Middle East, (1993)
 The Six-Day War: A Retrospective, (1996)
 The October War, (2001)
 Uncle Sam in Barbary: A Diplomatic History, (2004)
 Memoirs of a Foreign Service Arabist, (2013)

Obituaries and Biographies
Renaissance Man

Washington Post

Middle East Institute

References

External links
Foreign Service Journal article on his Lifetime Contributions to American Diplomacy Award. 

1923 births
2011 deaths
People from Kansas
Ambassadors of the United States to Algeria
Ambassadors of the United States to Lebanon
Ambassadors of the United States to Morocco
United States Army personnel of World War II
Kansas State University alumni
University of Virginia faculty
Johns Hopkins University faculty
Lawrence University faculty
United States Foreign Service personnel
Germany
United States Army officers
American prisoners of war in World War II
20th-century American diplomats
Burials at Arlington National Cemetery